James J. Matles (February 24, 1909-September 15, 1975) was an American trade union leader. Matles was a top official in the United Electrical, Radio and Machine Workers of America (UE) from 1937 until his retirement just days before his sudden death following the 1975 UE convention in California.

Matles was born in Soroca, Romania (now Moldova) to Jewish parents.

References

1909 births
1975 deaths
American people of Moldovan-Jewish descent
United Electrical, Radio and Machine Workers of America people
People from Manhattan
Trade unionists from New York (state)
Romanian emigrants to the United States
American trade union leaders